Anila Quayyum Agha (born 1965, in Lahore, Pakistan) is a Pakistani–American cross-disciplinary artist.  Agha explores social and gender roles, global politics, cultural multiplicity, and mass media within drawing, painting, and large-scale installations. In 2014, Agha's piece  'Intersections' won the international art competition, Artprize, twice over with the Public Vote Grand Prize and the Juried Grand Prize in a tie with Sonya Clark, the first time in Artprize's history.

Education
Agha studied at National College of Arts, Lahore, Pakistan, where she studied Textile Design, receiving her Bachelor of Fine Arts in 1989. She continued her studies in the United States at the University of North Texas, earning a Master of Fine Arts in Fiber Arts in 2004.

Career
Agha's experiences living within the boundaries of different faiths and cultures such as Islam and Christianity and Pakistan and the United States, has deeply influenced her art.  Through her work she explores cultural and social issues that affect women in patriarchal societies along with the immigrant experience of alienation and transience.

Academic
In 2008 Agha moved to Indianapolis to teach at Herron School of Art, where she was the Associate Professor of Drawing. In 2020, she was appointed Morris Eminent Scholar in Art at Augusta University in Georgia.

Arts

Drawing and painting
Working from her background in textile and fabric art and design, Agha uses a combination of textile processes such as embroidery, wax, dyes, and silk-screen printing within her drawings and paintings.  She creates patterns based on ancient Islamic geometric patterns and Islamic interlace patterns through hand cutting, laser cutting, and sewing on paper. She uses embroidery as a drawing method to bridge the gap between modern materials and historical patterns of traditional oppression and domestic servitude. She questions the gendering of textile work as domesticated and its exclusion of it being considered an art form.

Installation
In 2013 Agha started to explore working with light and shadow, in her piece 'Intersections', a 6.5' laser-cut wood cube encasing a light bulb, she pushed the binaries of public and private, light and shadow, and static and dynamic by relying on the symmetry of geometric design and the interpretation of the cast shadows.  The walls of the cube showcase Moorish patterns inspired from the Alhambra,a place where Islamic and Christian worlds intersect.  Growing up as a girl in Pakistan, Agha was not allowed to visit the mosques because of her gender.  It was from these memories of exclusion and of visiting the Alhambra that Agha started to think about all the problems that arise because of exclusion and wanted to create something that would include all, regardless of race, gender, and ethnicity.

Awards and recognition
Agha's work has been exhibited in solo and group shows across the US and in countries as far reaching as United Arab Emirates, India, and Spain.  She is currently being represented by Sundaram Tagore Gallery in New York City and Talley Dunn Gallery, Dallas, TX.  Along with winning Artprize Agha has also been the recipient of other awards such as the Efroymson Arts Fellowship  (2009), in 2013 she received the Creative Renewal Fellowship from the Indianapolis Arts Council, an IAHI grant, the Cincinnati Art Museum’s 2017 Schiele Prize, the Sculptors and Painters Grant in 2019 from the Joan Mitchell Foundation, and the Smithsonian Artist Fellowship.

Collections
 Anila Quayyum Agha's work is included in the following selected collections:
Eskenazi Art Museum, Bloomington, IN
 Grand Rapids Art Museum, Grand Rapids, MI
 Peabody Essex Museum, Salem, MA
 Cincinnati Art Museum, Cincinnati, OH
 Toledo Museum of Art, Toledo, OH
 Kiran Nadar Museum of Art, Delhi, India
Weisman Art Museum, Minneapolis, MN

References

Living people
National College of Arts alumni
1965 births
Pakistani women artists
American women artists
Pakistani emigrants to the United States
Artists from Lahore
21st-century American women